St. Francis Xavier College Church is a Catholic church in the Midtown neighborhood of St. Louis, Missouri, United States. The church was built by the Society of Jesus in 1836: the current building dates from 1884. It serves as a parish church in the Archdiocese of St. Louis and for the Saint Louis University community. It is a contributing property in the Midtown Historic District on the National Register of Historic Places and it is listed as a City Landmark in St. Louis.

History

The parish was established in 1836 when St. Louis Bishop Joseph Rosati, C.M. permitted the Jesuits to establish a parish at their college. It was St. Louis' first English-speaking parish. The congregation initially met in the college's student chapel, which was dedicated to St. Aloysius Gonzaga. The chapel was located on Washington Avenue between Ninth and Tenth Streets. As the parish grew plans for its own building were begun. The cornerstone for the first church was laid on April 12, 1840, by Bishop Rosati. It was located at the intersection of Ninth Street and Christy (Lucas) Avenue.  While from its beginning the church was dedicated to St. Francis Xavier it has always been popularly called the College Church.

Saint Louis University moved to its present location on Grand Boulevard in 1867. Archbishop Peter Richard Kenrick gave permission in 1879 for the College Church to move to the new campus. Plans for the current church were drawn up by St. Louis architect Thomas Walsh. He had previously designed DuBourg Hall, which served as the only university building for several years. Excavation for the new church began on June 8, 1884, and the cornerstone was laid by Coadjutor Archbishop Patrick J. Ryan. He was assisted by Bishops William H. Gross, C.Ss.R. of Savannah and Joseph Dwenger, C.Pp.S. of Fort Wayne. By the end of the year, the lower church was completed and a roof built over it. It served the parish as its church until the upper church was completed.

The upper church was built as finances allowed. The original architect, Walsh, died before it could be built.  The Rev. Henry C. Bronsgeest, S.J., the parish pastor, hired Chicago architect Henry Switzer to complete the church. Bronsgeest had the upper church modeled after St. Colman's Cathedral in Cobh, Ireland. The church was completed in 1898, with the exception of the spire on top of the tower. It was completed in 1914 and bells were placed in the tower at the same time. The windows were created by Emil Frei Jr., and they were installed from 1929 to 1938. George and Anna Backer provided the funding for the windows.

The church was listed as a City Landmark in St. Louis in 1976.  It was listed on the National Register of Historic Places as a contributing property in the Midtown Historic District in 1978. A major renovation of the church was completed in 1990.

See also
 List of Jesuit sites

References

External links

Official website

Religious organizations established in 1836
1836 establishments in Missouri
Roman Catholic churches completed in 1898
Jesuit churches in the United States
Saint Louis University
Roman Catholic churches in St. Louis
Landmarks of St. Louis
Historic district contributing properties in Missouri
Churches on the National Register of Historic Places in Missouri
National Register of Historic Places in St. Louis
Midtown St. Louis
Buildings and structures in St. Louis
Tourist attractions in St. Louis
19th-century Roman Catholic church buildings in the United States
Gothic Revival church buildings in Missouri